Kupferberg is a municipality in the district of Kulmbach, in Bavaria, Germany. It is situated in the Frankenwald, 9 km northeast of Kulmbach.

Notable people 

 Joseph Gabriel Findel (1828-1905),  freemason writer.
 Peter Zeidler named Hofmann (1525-1593), merchant for jewels with extensive business connections.

References

Kulmbach (district)